Guennette is a 1977 Pink Laurentian granite sculpture by Michael Heizer, installed on the Massachusetts Institute of Technology (MIT) campus, in Cambridge, Massachusetts, United States.

References

1977 sculptures
Granite sculptures in Massachusetts
Massachusetts Institute of Technology campus
Outdoor sculptures in Cambridge, Massachusetts